In acoustics and audio, a transient is a high amplitude, short-duration sound at the beginning of a waveform that occurs in phenomena such as musical sounds, noises or speech.  Transients do not necessarily directly depend on the frequency of the tone they initiate. It contains a high degree of non-periodic components and a higher magnitude of high frequencies than the harmonic content of that sound.

Transients are more difficult to encode with many audio compression algorithms, causing pre-echo.

Sonar 
The term transient is used by military sonar operators to describe unexpected sounds emanating from another vessel such as operating machinery, a metal hatch being slammed, or the flooding and pressurization of torpedo or vertical launch tubes.

See also

 Prefix (acoustics)
 Impulse function
 Onset (audio)
 Transient response – a common electrical engineering term that may be the source of the idea of an acoustic "transient"

References

Acoustics
Sonar

de:Einschwingvorgang